Eşref Bilgiç (14 November 1908 – 9 December 1992) was a Turkish international association football player and manager. He represented Turkey at senior level in 2 international encounters.

Career
Bilgiç spent almost his entire career at Beşiktaş J.K. between 1926 and 1947 where he achieved numerous local titles.

Bilgiç represented Turkey at senior level at two occasions, including one encounter at 1931 Balkan Cup against Yugoslavia, ended 2–0 in favour of Turkey. He scored once at friendly game against Bulgaria which ended 3–2 for Bulgaria on 4 November 1932.

Bilgiç managed Beşiktaş J.K. in 1957.

Honours

Club
Beşiktaş
 Istanbul Football League (7): 1933–34, 1938–39, 1939–40, 1940–41, 1941–42, 1942–43, 1944–45
 Turkish National Division (1): 1941
 Istanbul Football Cup (1): 1944
 Prime Minister's Cup (1): 1944

International
 Balkan Cup Runner-up  (1): 1931

References
Citations

External links
Eşref Bilgiç at TFF

1908 births
1992 deaths
Footballers from Istanbul
Turkish footballers
Turkey international footballers
Association football forwards
Süper Lig players
Beşiktaş J.K. footballers
Turkish football managers
Kasımpaşa S.K. managers
Beşiktaş J.K. managers